Dipoenata is a genus of comb-footed spiders that was first described by J. Wunderlich in 1988.

Species
 it contains five species, found in Europe, Brazil, Venezuela, Panama, and on Hispaniola:
Dipoenata balboae (Chickering, 1943) – Panama, Venezuela
Dipoenata cana Kritscher, 1996 – Malta
Dipoenata conica (Chickering, 1943) – Panama, Brazil
Dipoenata longitarsis (Denis, 1962) – Madeira
Dipoenata morosa (Bryant, 1948) – Hispaniola to Brazil

Formerly included:
D. canariensis (Wunderlich, 1987) (Transferred to Lasaeola)
D. flavitarsis Wunderlich, 1992 (Transferred to Lasaeola)
D. sicki (Levi, 1963) (Transferred to Dipoena)

In synonymy:
D. cylindrica  = Dipoenata conica (Chickering, 1943)

See also
 List of Theridiidae species

References

Araneomorphae genera
Spiders of Central America
Spiders of South America
Theridiidae